Grace Horrell-Thomas (born 25 November 2001) is a Welsh footballer who plays as a forward for FA Women's National League South club Cardiff City LFC and the Wales women's national team.

Early career
Horrell-Thomas started her career at Cardiff City when she was nine years old, before moving to Barry Town for the 2015/16 season. Cardiff City then re-signed Horrell-Thomas for the 2020/21 season.

International career
Horrell-Thomas has represented Wales at multiple age groups, starting at under-15 level right through to earning her first senior cap in a friendly against Italy in 2019, where she appeared as an 87th minute substitute.

References

2001 births
Living people
Welsh women's footballers
Women's association football forwards
Cardiff City Ladies F.C. players
Wales women's international footballers